This is a list of Aten asteroids, a group of near-Earth objects. , there are 1125 known Atens, most of which remain provisionally designated without a number, as they have not been observed at two or more oppositions. The list is divided into named members, brightest, notable and other record holding Aten asteroids. For a list of existing articles, see  Aten asteroids (category).

Named Atens 

, a total of thirteen Aten asteroids have received a name. They are listed in chronological order of discovery.

The February 15, 2013 Earth encounter shortened 367943 Duende orbital period to about 317 days, changing its orbital class from Apollo to Aten.

Brightest Atens 

The following lists Aten asteroids thought to be larger than 2 kilometers across. Assuming an albedo of 0.15, this converts to an absolute magnitude of about 16.2

Selection of designated Atens

Record-holding Atens 

The following is a list of current records for Aten asteroids

References

External links 
 List of Aten Minor Planets

Asteroid records

Lists of asteroids